The term Heiligenbeil can refer to:
The German name of Mamonovo, Russia
Heiligenbeil concentration camp built near Mamonovo
Heiligenbeil Pocket, part of the Eastern Front of World War II